Alexandra Kiroi-Bogatyreva (born 4 March 2002) is an Australian rhythmic gymnast. Kiroi-Bogatyeva was the 2018, 2019 and 2022 Australian All Around Rhythmic Gymnastics Champion.

Early years
Born in Wellington, New Zealand, Kiroi-Bogatyreva was raised in Melbourne, Australia. She started gymnastics at the age of 3 and moved to the specialised field of Rhythmic Gymnastics at the age of 6 with Prahran Rhythmic Gymnastics Specialist Centre in Windsor, an inner South-Eastern suburb of Melbourne. She attended The King David School in Armadale.

Early international career (2012–2017)
Kiroi-Bogatyreva first competed internationally in 2012, marking her debut with all-around gold medal at 2012 Vitri Cup in Spain, organised by Olena Vitrichenko.

Kiroi-Bogatyreva's junior years in gymnastics were decorated with notable results including third All-Around at the inaugural Australia Cup (qualification event for 2018 Commonwealth Games), second All-Around at the 2016 Stelle di Natale event in Italy, first All-Around at the 2017 Luxembourg Cup and 11th All Around at the 2017 FIG Aphrodite Cup in Greece. As a junior Kiroi-Bogatyreva was always found in the top ranks of Australian gymnasts, winning multiple national titles. Other highlights of Kiroi-Bogatyreva's junior career were competing in the junior section of the Holon RG Grand Prix in Israel and the AEON Cup in Tokyo, Japan known as "The World Club Championships". The 2016 AEON Cup field included all 2016 Olympic medallists and leading gymnasts from over 20 nations.

Senior international career (2018–current)
In 2018, Alexandra Kiroi-Bogatyreva turned Senior International. Only weeks after celebrating her 16th birthday Kiroi-Bogatyreva was competing at the Commonwealth Games.

Commonwealth Games (2018–2022)
At the 2018 Commonwealth Games, Alexandra Kiroi-Bogatyreva was just 16 years old and competing in her first major Senior International event. She won bronze medals in the rhythmic gymnastics ball and team events; the team of three gymnasts included Enid Sung and Danielle Prince.

Kiroi-Bogatyreva made her second Commonwealth Games appearance in Rhythmic Gymnastics in Birmingham 2022. The rhythmic gymnast won her first career Commonwealth Games gold in the individual clubs final, which came after bronze in the individual all-around final and a team silver, completing a full set of medals from 2022 Games.

National titles
Since 2018, Kiroi-Bogatyreva is recognised as Australia's leading rhythmic gymnast. Following her success at the 2018 Commonwealth Games, and after making her first appearance at the World Cup series, Kiroi-Bogatyreva has cemented her status as Australia's top rhythmic gymnast by winning a her first senior National Title at the 2018 Australian Gymnastics Championships.

In 2019, Kiroi-Bogatyreva successfully defended her title, winning all 5 available gold medals and leading her state team (Victoria) to a team medal.

In 2021, Kiroi-Bogatyreva took three national titles in individual apparatus in hoop, ball and clubs, with a silver medal in ribbon.

In May 2022 at the Australian Gymnastics Championship, Kiroi-Bogatyreva regained the individual all-around national title, while adding two more individual apparatus national titles and a team gold medal.

World Cups and World Championships
Kiroi-Bogatyreva has represented Australia in ten World Cups and three World Championships.

After the 2018 Commonwealth Games, Kiroi-Bogatyreva made her World Cup debut in Baku competing at AGF Trophy World Cup and followed on to compete in the 2018 World Challenge Cup series in Guadalajara, Spain and Portimão, Portugal.

In September 2018, Kiroi-Bogatyreva represented Australia at the 2018 Rhythmic Gymnastics World Championships in Sofia, Bulgaria. In the following year, Kiroi-Bogatyreva again represented Australia, at the 2019 Rhythmic Gymnastics World Championships in Baku, Azerbaijan.

Early in October 2021 Alexandra participated in the last event of 2021 FIG Rhythmic Gymnastics World Cup series - World Challenge Cup at Cluj-Napoca in Romania.

The 2021 Rhythmic Gymnastics World Championships were held from 27 to 31 October 2021 in Kitakyushu, Japan, and Kiroi-Bogatyreva again represented Australia.

In 2021, Kiroi-Bogatyreva ranked 33rd in the FIG World Ranking - World Challenge Cup Ranking List 2021.

In 2022 after attending two of five World Cups, Kiroi-Bogatyreva ranks 38th in the World on the World Cup Ranking List 2022.

After attending three Games events, Kiroi-Bogatyreva concluded 2022 season by taking part in 2022 Rhythmic Gymnastics World Championships in Sofia, Bulgaria.

World Games 2022
After successfully qualifying for the 2022 World Games in 2019, Kiroi-Bogatyreva took part in this pinnacle event hosted in Birmingham, Alabama, USA. Day one of the competition saw her place 12th in ball and 20th in hoop, scoring 29.250 and 27.700 respectively.

The second day of competition saw her finish 14th in ribbon and 15th in clubs, with scores of 27.900 and 28.950 respectively.

Maccabiah Games 2022
Only days after representing Australia at the World Games, Kiroi-Bogatyreva, Maccabi Australia proud member and Maccabi Victoria Hall of Fame Inductee, joined the Australian team in Tel-Aviv, Israel, for another major competition - the Maccabiah Games 2022.

Kiroi-Bogatyreva joined Israelis Daria Atamanov and Noga Blok on the podium, taking 5 bronze medals.

Other significant events and recent activities
In December 2021, Kiroi-Bogatyreva took part in an experimental international tournament "Divine Grace" organised by Olympic Champion Alina Kabaeva. Kiroi-Bogatyreva finished in 7th place, her performance was noted in the Russian media.

In 2021, Kiroi-Bogatyreva joined the FIG Safeguarding Working Group set up by the International Gymnastics Federation (FIG) and the Gymnastics Ethics Foundation (GEF) to drive a positive cultural change in the world of gymnastics leading to a safe training environment for everyone.

On 6th of November 2022 Kiroi-Bogatyreva attended an award ceremony at Government House, Melbourne where Governor of Victoria, Her Excellency the Honourable Linda Dessau awarded Alexandra Australian Sport Medal (ASM) for her achievements at the 2022 Commonwealth Games.

Awards and accolades
 Gymnastics Victoria Rising Star Award 2013 
 Gymnastics Victoria Rising Star Award 2014
 Maccabi Australia Junior Sportswoman of the Year 2014
 Gymnastics Victoria High Performance Gymnast of the Year 2015
 Maccabi Australia Rising Star of the Year 2015
 Gymnastics Victoria High Performance Gymnast of the Year 2018
 Gymnastics Australia Senior Gymnast of the Year 2018
 Gymnastics Australia Athlete of Distinction 2018 
 Gymnastics Australia Senior Gymnast of the Year 2019
 Gymnastics Australia Athlete of Distinction 2019 
 Gymnastics Victoria High Performance Gymnast of the Year 2019  
 Maccabi Australia Junior Sportswoman of the Year2016-2019 
 Maccabi Victoria Junior Sportswoman of the Year 2013 - 2019 
 Maccabi VictoriaHall of Fame Inductee (for contribution to sport), 2022
 Gymnastics Victoria High Performance Gymnast of the Year 2022
 Australian Sport Medal

Personal life
Kiroi-Bogatyreva is currently studying for a law degree at Monash University.

References

2002 births
Australian rhythmic gymnasts
Commonwealth Games bronze medallists for Australia
Commonwealth Games medallists in gymnastics
Gymnasts at the 2018 Commonwealth Games
Living people
Monash University alumni
Jewish Australian sportspeople
21st-century Australian women
Commonwealth Games gold medallists for Australia
Commonwealth Games silver medallists for Australia
Gymnasts at the 2022 Commonwealth Games
Competitors at the 2022 World Games
Medallists at the 2018 Commonwealth Games
Medallists at the 2022 Commonwealth Games